Markus Schinwald (born 1973) is an Austrian visual artist.  He lives and works in Vienna, Austria, and New York.

Work
Occupied space and the body in its cultural context are central to Schinwald's works as foundational elements for transformation and manipulation.  He has worked in a variety of media: painting, sculpture, film, performance, and large, site-specific installations. His work "is centered on the body as a cultural construct, as an incessantly actualized site at which the subject is constituted both in its identity and its instability and transversality. He is not true to one medium, but rather nomadic as he appropriates methods and/or devices from cultural theory, film, and poetry, among others. Dysfunctionality and disorder are key notions in his work."
Schinwald's early training in fashion and costume history often becomes apparent in his work. One of his earliest pieces, Jubelhemd (1997), hovers between straight jacket and formal wear. The arms have been sewn in upside-down, provoking an ambivalent gesture reminiscent of both surrender and celebration, with hands to the sky.

In his work, Schinwald creates a precarious, at times unsettling, atmosphere. He equips the subjects of his 19th century portraits with peculiar veils, supports, wires and bandages, which the artist perceives as "prostheses for unspecified cases." Schinwald first began his over-painted portraits in the late 1990s, and has been a reference point for later work by artists like Hans-Peter Feldman, who imposes clown-noses onto oil portraits in a similar manner. Together with a team of conservators, Schinwald developed a technique in 2011 for integrating historical paintings into large canvases, extending the original work which, in effect, alters not only the scale of the artwork, but blurs the lines of the inserted image's historical and contextual fixity.

Like his manipulated paintings and black-and-white portraits, Schinwald's installations and spatial interventions, (for, among others, SFMoMA, Yvon Lambert Gallery, and Migros Museum) embrace constraints and compulsions. Representation and actuation often overlap in his work, whether it be the display of possible prosthetics with historical paintings, or manipulated table-leg sculptures with a choreographed performance.  In 2013, a terrarium model at the Palais de Tokyo, Paris served as both model and overture to a companion exhibition, an extensive, mid-career survey, at CAPC Bordeaux,

Since 1999, Schinwald has also worked collaboratively with dancer Oleg Soulimenko on the Stage Matrix series, which has toured worldwide and been performed at, among others, Performa 07, Moderna Museet, and the Tanzquartier, Vienna. In 2015, Schinwald choreographed a piece for the Royal Swedish Ballet. From 2012 to 2018, Schinwald was the Vice President of the Vienna Secession.  Together with Thomas D. Trummer and Hans Ulrich Obrist, he is also curator of the EVN Collection in Austria.

Exhibitions
Schinwald is represented by Thaddaeus Ropac (London, Salzburg, Paris) and Gio Marconi (Milan).

Schinwald represented Austria in 2011 at the 54th Venice Biennial, where he created a vast, hanging labyrinth that disrupted the symmetry of Josef Hoffmann's 1934 construction. In the film for the exhibition, Orient (2011), the actors, appearing shipwrecked in decaying architecture, move with partially impulsive, partially dance-like choreography, both resisting and collaborating with their surroundings.

Schinwald has had numerous solo museum exhibitions including Magazin III Stockholm (2015),  Museum M, Leuven (2015), SFMoMA & CCA Wattis (2014), Triennale, Milan (2014),  Kunstverein Hannover (2011), Lentos Museum, Linz (2011), Kunsthaus Bregenz (2009), Műcsarnok Kunsthalle Budapest (2009), Migros Museum für Gegenwartskunst, Zurich (2008), Augarten Contemporary, Vienna (2007), Aspen Art Museum (2006), and the Frankfurter Kunstverein (2004).

His works are to be found in numerous international collections, including the MoMA, Tate Modern Prada Foundation, SFMoMA, Musée d'Art Moderne, Paris, Kunsthaus Zürich, Israel Museum, Jerusalem, and the MUMOK – Museum Moderner Kunst, Vienna.

Filmography
 dictio pii (2001)
 diarios [barragan] (2003)
 diarios [to you] (2003)
 1st Part Conditional (2004)
 Children's Crusade (2004)
 Orient (2011)

Monographs
 Moderna Museet, dictio pii, Stockholm: Moderna Museet, 2001. .
 Frankfurter Kunstverein, Nicolaus Schafhausen (eds.), MARKUS SCHINWALD, Tableau Twain, New York: Lukas&Sternberg, 2004. 
 Atelier Augarten and migros museum, Agnes Husslein Arco, Heike Munder, Thomas Trummer (eds.), Markus Schinwald, Zurich: JRP/Ringier, 2007. 
 Kunsthaus Bregenz, Markus Schinwald: Vanishing Lessons, Cologne: Buchhandlung Walther König, 2009. 
 54th Venice Biennial, Markus Schinwald: La Biennale di Venezia 2011, Nürnberg: Verlag für moderne Kunst Nürnberg, 2011. .
 Kunverein Hannover, Lentos Museum Linz, Markus Schinwald, Nürnberg: Verlag für moderne Kunst Nürnberg, 2011. 
 Galerie Thaddaeus Ropac, Dominique de Font-Réaulx,Markus Schinwald, Paris: Galerie Thaddeus Ropac, 2016.

References

External links
 www.markus-schinwald.com
 Markus Schinwald at Yvon Lambert, Paris
 Markus Schinwald at Gio Marconi, Milan
 Markus Schinwald at Galerie Thaddaeus Ropac
 Birgit Sonna on Markus Schinwald at Kunsthaus Bregenz (German)
 Aaron Betsky on the Austrian Pavilion 2011

Austrian installation artists
Austrian sculptors
Austrian male sculptors
Austrian video artists
Austrian painters
Austrian male painters
Living people
1973 births
Austrian contemporary artists